Jubilation may refer to:
 Jubilation!, a parade at Tokyo Disneyland
 Jubilation (The Band album), 1998
Jubilation (Randy Johnston album), 1994
 Jubilation (The Rowans album), 1977
 Jubilation, a musical composition by Richard Edward Wilson
 "Jubilation" (song), a 1972 song by Paul Anka

See also 
 Jubilation Lee or Jubilee, a character in the Marvel Comics universe
 Jubilation T. Cornpone, a character in the comic strip Li'l Abner
 Celebration (disambiguation)
 Happiness (disambiguation)
 Jubilee (disambiguation)